New Zealand competed at the 2000 Summer Olympics in Sydney, Australia. The New Zealand Olympic Committee was represented by 151 athletes and 100 officials at these Summer Olympics.

Medalists

|style="text-align:left; width:78%; vertical-align:top;"|

Archery

Athletics

Track and road

Field

Basketball

Men's
Preliminary round
Lost to France (50–76)
Lost to China (60–75)
Lost to Italy (66–78)
Lost to United States (56–102)
Lost to Lithuania (75–85)
Classification match 
11th-12th place: Defeated Angola (70–60) → 11th place

Team roster
 Pero Cameron
 Mark Dickel
 Paul Henare
 Robert Hickey
 Phill Jones
 Ralph Lattimore
 Sean Marks
 Kirk Penney
 Peter Pokai
 Tony Rampton
 Brad Riley
 Nenad Vučinić

Women's
Preliminary round
Lost to Poland (52–72)
Lost to Korea (62–101)
Lost to Cuba (55–74)
Lost to United States (42–93)
Lost to Russia (54–92)
Classification match 
11th-12th place: Defeated Senegal (72–69) → 11th place

Team roster
 Tania Brunton
 Belinda Colling
 Megan Compain
 Rebecca Cotton
 Kirstin Daly
 Gina Farmer
 Sally Farmer
 Dianne L'Ami
 Donna Loffhagen
 Julie Ofsoski
 Leone Patterson
 Leanne Walker

Boxing

Cycling

Mountain bike

Road
Men

Women

Track

Time trial

Sprint

Keirin

Points race

Pursuit

Equestrian

Dressage

Eventing

Jumping

Field hockey

Women's team competition
Preliminary round (Pool B)
 New Zealand – Germany 1–1
 New Zealand – China 0–2
 New Zealand – The Netherlands 3–4
 New Zealand – South Africa 1–0
Medal pool
 New Zealand – Australia 0–3
 New Zealand – Spain 2–2 
 New Zealand – Argentina 1–7 (→ Sixth Place)
Team roster
 Anne-Marie Irving (gk)
 Helen Clarke (gk)
 Sandy Bennett
 Diana Weavers
 Rachel Petrie
 Jenny Duck
 Caryn Paewai
 Skippy Hamahona
 Anna Lawrence
 Suzie Muirhead
 Tina Bell-Kake
 Moira Senior
 Kylie Foy
 Kate Trolove
 Michelle Turner
 Mandy Smith

Gymnastics

Artistic
David Phillips and Laura Robertson represented New Zealand in the sport of artistic gymnastics at the 2000 Summer Olympics.

Women

Judo

Men

Women

Rowing

New Zealand qualified three boats for the 2000 Summer Olympics: men's single sculls, men's coxless four, and women's single sculls.

Men

Women

Qualification legend: FA=Final A (medal); SA/B=Semifinals A/B

Sailing

Men

Women

Open
Fleet racing

Mixed racing

Shooting

New Zealand was represented in shooting with five men and two women.

Men

Women

Softball

Women's team competition 
Preliminary round robin
Lost to Australia (2:3)
Defeated Canada (3:2)
Lost to PR China (0:10)
Defeated Cuba (6:2)
Lost to Italy (0:1)
Lost to United States (0:2)
Lost to Japan (1:2)
Semifinals
 Did not advance → Sixth place
Team roster
Zavana Aranga
Jaye Bailey
Kim Dermott
Rhonda Hira
Melanie Hulme
Lisa Kersten
Ruta Lealamanu
Cindy Potae
Char Pouaka
Kiri Shaw
Jackie Smith
Fiona Timu
Helen Townsend
Melisa Upu
Gina Weber

Swimming

Men

Women

Triathlon

New Zealand's heavily touted triathletes were unable to perform up to expectations in the inaugural Olympic triathlon. In particular, Hamish Carter, who had been considered likely to win the event, placed twenty-sixth.

Weightlifting

References

Wallechinsky, David (2004). The Complete Book of the Summer Olympics (Athens 2004 Edition). Toronto, Canada. . 
International Olympic Committee (2001). The Results. Retrieved 12 November 2005.
Sydney Organising Committee for the Olympic Games (2001). Official Report of the XXVII Olympiad Volume 1: Preparing for the Games. Retrieved 20 November 2005.
Sydney Organising Committee for the Olympic Games (2001). Official Report of the XXVII Olympiad Volume 2: Celebrating the Games. Retrieved 20 November 2005.
Sydney Organising Committee for the Olympic Games (2001). The Results. Retrieved 20 November 2005.
International Olympic Committee Web Site

Nations at the 2000 Summer Olympics
2000 Summer Olympics
O